Dragash or Sharr ( or Sharri) or Dragaš, is a town and municipality located in the Prizren District of Kosovo. According to the 2011 census, the town of Dragash has 1,098 inhabitants, while the municipality has 34,827 inhabitants. The Albanian name Sharri is a reference to the Šar Mountains (in Albanian Sharr). The Serbian name Dragaš comes from medieval Serbian lord Constantine Dragaš.

History 

Dragaš was named after Serbian medieval noble family of the same name which served Dušan the Mighty (r. 1331-1355) and Uroš the Weak (r. 1355-1371). From 1877 to 1913, Dragaš was part of Kosovo Vilayet in the Ottoman Empire. From 1929 to 1941, Dragaš was part of the Vardar Banovina of the Kingdom of Yugoslavia. From 1941 to 1999 Dragaš was part of the autonomous province of Kosovo within the republic of Serbia and part of the Yugoslav federation.

The Gora municipality and Opoja region (attached to Prizren municipality) remained separated during the Milošević period. During the Kosovo war (1999), Albanians from Opoja fled to neighbouring Albania in cars, trucks and tractors along with others on foot that following the conflict returned home. After the war, the Gorani-majority Gora municipality was merged with the Albanian inhabited Opoja region to form the municipality of Dragash by the United Nations Mission (UNMIK) and the new administrative unit has an Albanian majority.

The town of Dragash is the regional and municipal centre for both the Gora and Opoja regions of Dragash municipality. Following 1999, Dragash has a mixed population of Gorani, whom live in the lower neighbourhood and Albanians in the upper neighbourhood that constitute the majority of inhabitants.

Apart from the multiethic town of Dragash, the Gorani of Kosovo continue to live in villages primarily inhabited by their community in Gora and relations with Albanians remain tense. Albanians predominantly live in the Opoja region. Mixed marriage between both communities do not occur with the exception of a few Gorani families that have migrated to Prizren.

Geography 

The territory of the Dragaš municipality lies in the northern latitude of 41 52' 30" to 42 09' 03" and longitude of 20 35' 39" to 20 48' 26". The whole territory is surrounded by the Šar Mountains, then Koritnik Mountain, mountain Gjalic and Cylen in the direction of Prizren. Only one part of the territory in Prizren direction is hilly with a relatively slight slope by which this territory is connected with Prizren basin and through Prizren with the world.

Governance 

Aside from the town of Dragaš, the following settlements consist the municipality:
 Baçkë/Bačka 
 Bellobrad/Belobrod
 Blaç/Bljač
 Breznë/Brezna
 Brod
 Brodosanë/Brodosavce
 Brrut/Brut
 Buçë/Buča
 Buzez/Buzec
 Dikancë/Dikance
 Glloboçicë/Globočica
 Kapër/Kapra
 Kërstec/Donji Krstac
 Kosavë/Kosovce
 Krushevë/Kruševo
 Kuk/Kukovce
 Kukjan/Kukuljane
 Kuklibeg
 Leshtan/Leštane
 Lubovishtë/Ljubovište 
 Mlikë/Mlike 
 Orçushë/Orčuša 
 Plavë/Plava
 Pllajnik/Plajnik
 Radeshë/Radeša
 Rapçë/Gornja Rapča
 Rapçë/Donja Rapča
 Restelicë/Restelica
 Rrenc/Rence
 Shajnë/Šajinovac
 Vranishtë/Vranište 
 Xërxë/Zrze
 Zaplluzhë/Zaplužje
 Zgatar
 Zlipotok/Zli Potok 
 Zym/Zjum Opoljski

The emblem of Dragaš includes an image of the Šarplaninac dog.

The other symbol of Dragaš is Šar cheese.

Economy 

The main employers in the area are the Municipality, Kosovo Police, and private companies as “KUK Commerc”, “Meka” and former state-owned enterprises.

All major local companies were formerly state-run and, as elsewhere in Kosovo, are currently under the responsibility of KTA. The original UNMIK strategy towards these public enterprises consisted of carrying out a process of ‘commercialisation’. This process was believed to be the best way to revive the enterprises, although no foreign investors decided to invest.

Infrastructure 

The municipality is mountainous and therefore has related infrastructural problems (e.g. problematic access to some villages during winter season). Its infrastructure was in a state of serious disrepair before the war, due to a combination of harsh winters and state neglect. Roads, in particular, (Zhur–Dragaš; Dragaš-Brod; Dragaš- Restelica) require urgent improvement for the social-economic development of the area. Bus connections between Dragaš town and the Opoja area continue to improve and the services to Gora are organized by the two OSCE-SIMF buses donated to the municipality. There is a free school bus service provided by the municipality along Gora routes. Taxi services exist but are largely unaffordable for the population. OSCE through SIMF/ ECSF funds supported also the rehabilitation of the Heath House.

Mobile coverage is also improving. Water supply is ensured in all villages.

Demography 

According to the last official census done in 2011, the municipality of Dragaš has 34,827 inhabitants. Based on the population estimates from the Kosovo Agency of Statistics in 2016, the municipality has 34,349 inhabitants. The municipality's population mostly lives in rural areas (97%).

The municipality is split into the regions of Opolje and Gora. Most of the Gorani live in Gora, whilst most Albanians live in Opoja and are majority population of whole municipality.

Due to geopolitical circumstances, some of the local Gorani people have over time self declared themselves as Albanians, Macedonians, Bosniaks, Muslim Bulgarians, Serbs, Turks and Muslims (nationality).

The ethnic composition of the municipality:
 1971 – 13,867 (51.6%) Albanians; 11,076 (41.3%) Gorani and Bosniaks – total 26,850
 1981 – 18,623 (53%) Albanians; 15,942 (45.5%) Gorani and Bosniaks – total 35,054
 1991 – 22,785 (57.8%) Albanians; 16,129 (40.9%) Gorani and Bosniaks – total 39,435
 2011 - 20,287 (59.6%) Albanians; 13,057 (38.4%) Gorani and Bosnians - total 33,997
OSCE estimates say the following:

 January 1999 – 27,633 (61.3%) Albanians; 17,470 (38.7%) Gorani and Bosniaks – total 45,103
 March 2000 – 24,856 (78%) Albanians; 9,706 (28.1%) Gorani and Bosniaks – total 34,562
 January 2006 – 22,800 (55.9%) Albanians; 17,975 (44.1%) Gorani and Bosniaks – total 40,775

According to the census in 2011, a significant number of people (4,100) self identified as Bosniaks in the municipality.

Notes

References

Bibliography

External links 

 
Cities in Kosovo
Municipalities of Kosovo
Populated places in Prizren District
Gorani people